Constance Collier (born Laura Constance Hardie; 22 January 1878 – 25 April 1955) was an English stage and film actress and acting coach. She wrote hit plays and films with Ivor Novello and she was the first person to be treated with insulin in Europe.

Early life and stage career
Born Laura Constance Hardie in Windsor, Berkshire to Auguste Cheetham Hardie and Eliza Georgina Collier, Constance Collier made her stage debut at the age of three, when she played Fairy Peasblossom in A Midsummer Night's Dream. In 1893, at the age of 15, she joined the Gaiety Girls, the famous dance troupe based at the Gaiety Theatre in London. In 1905, Collier married English actor Julian Boyle (stage name Julian L'Estrange). 
She soon became so tall that she towered over all the other dancers. In addition, she had an enormous personality and considerable determination. On 27 December 1906, Sir Herbert Beerbohm Tree's extravagant revival of Antony and Cleopatra opened at His Majesty's Theatre, with Tree as Mark Antony and Collier as Cleopatra, a performance for which she received much critical praise.

Famed for his realistic productions, Tree and his designer, Percy Macquoid, dressed Collier in a range of spectacular costumes. Later, Collier commented: "There is only a mention in the play of Cleopatra appearing as the goddess Isis. Tree elaborated this into a great tableau... Cleopatra, robed in silver, crowned in silver, carrying a golden scepter and the symbol of the sacred golden calf in her hand, went in procession through the streets of Alexandria, the ragged, screaming populace acclaiming the Queen, half in hate, half in superstitious fear and joy as she made her sacrilegious ascent to her high throne in the market-place."

Collier was now established as a popular and distinguished actress. In January 1908, she starred with Beerbohm Tree at His Majesty's Theatre in J. Comyn's new play The Mystery of Edwin Drood, based on Charles Dickens's unfinished novel of the same name. Later that year, she made the first of several tours of the United States. During the second, made with Beerbohm Tree in 1916, she made four silent films, including an uncredited appearance in D. W. Griffith's Intolerance (she can be seen being carried through the entrance to the city in the Babylonian part of the film) and as Lady Macbeth in Tree's disastrous first film interpretation of Shakespeare's Macbeth.

In 1918, her husband died from influenza while they were in New York. Following his death she returned to England. No children were born from the marriage.

In the early 1920s, she established a close friendship with the actor Ivor Novello. They both appeared in the silent film "The Bohemian Girl" in 1922 with Gladys Cooper and Ellen Terry.  They wrote hits together using the nom de plume of James Lestrange. Around the same time, Collier became seriously ill from diabetes and this proved expensive. She was sent to Switzerland for treatment in 1923 then taken to a doctor in Strasbourg, she was the first patient in Europe ever to be treated with the drug insulin following its recent discovery by Frederick Banting and others in Toronto. Fully recovered, she played the Duchesse de Surennes in Somerset Maugham's comedy Our Betters, and in the following year, collaborated with Ivor Novello on a play called The Rat. She also appeared in several plays with him, including the British version of the American success, The Firebrand by Edwin Justus Mayer. In 1924 Collier introduced Novello to the poet Siegfried Sassoon, with whom he had a six-month affair. While Sassoon destroyed his diary for this period, his unhappiness over their relationship became well-known, and according to his biographer Jean Moorcroft Wilson, 'pitched him into [what he referred to as] an "unblinking hell"'.

Collier's writing career is notable for her collaboration with Deems Taylor on the libretto of the opera Peter Ibbetson, which was premiered at the Metropolitan Opera in February 1931 and which received mixed reviews. In 1935, upon her arrival in Hollywood, Luise Rainer hired Collier to improve Rainer's theatre acting and English, and to learn the basics of film acting.

Hollywood

In the late 1920s Collier relocated to Hollywood where she became a voice coach and teacher in diction. This was during the tumultuous changeover from silent films to sound and many silent actors with no theatre training were scrambling for lessons.

Her most famous pupil was arguably Colleen Moore. Film historian Kevin Brownlow interviewed Moore for the series Hollywood (1980) about the silent film era. Moore recounted that upon taking voice lessons from a "very famous lady" the teacher asked "is it true that you make 10,000 dollars a week?"  Moore replied, "no ma'am, I make 12,500 a week". The teacher Moore was referring to was Constance Collier. Collier nevertheless maintained ties to Broadway and would appear in several plays in the 1930s.
In 1932 Collier starred as Carlotta Vance in the original production of George S. Kaufman and Edna Ferber's comedy Dinner at Eight. The role was played in the 1933 film version by Marie Dressler.

She appeared in the films Stage Door (1937), Mitchell Leisen's Kitty (1945, a comedic performance as Lady Susan, the drunken aunt of Ray Milland), Perils of Pauline with Betty Hutton, Alfred Hitchcock's Rope (1948) and Otto Preminger's Whirlpool (1949).

During the making of the film version of Stage Door, she became great friends with Katharine Hepburn, a friendship that lasted the rest of Collier's life.

Collier was presented with the American Shakespeare Festival Theatre Award for distinguished service in training and guiding actors in Shakespearean roles. Collier was a drama coach for many famous actors, including Audrey Hepburn, Vivien Leigh and Marilyn Monroe. She coached Katharine Hepburn during Hepburn's world tour performing Shakespeare in the 1950s. Upon Collier's death in 1955, Hepburn "inherited" Collier's secretary Phyllis Wilbourn, who remained with Hepburn as her secretary for 40 years.

Collier has a star on the Hollywood Walk of Fame.                

Collier died of a heart attack in Manhattan on 25 April 1955 at the age of 77.

Filmography
Silent

 The Tongues of Men (1916) – Jane Bartlett
 The Code of Marcia Gray (1916) – Marcia Gray
 Macbeth (1916) – Lady Macbeth
 Intolerance (1916) – Extra (uncredited)
 The Impossible Woman (1919) – Mme. Kraska
 Bleak House (1920) – Lady Dedlock
 The Bohemian Girl (1922) – Queen

Sound

 Shadow of Doubt (1935) – Aunt Melissa Pilson
 Anna Karenina (1935) – Countess Lidia (uncredited)
 Professional Soldier (1935) – Lady Augusta
 Little Lord Fauntleroy (1936) – Lady Lorridaile
 Girls' Dormitory (1936) – Professor Augusta Wimmer
 Thunder in the City (1937) – The Duchess
 Wee Willie Winkie (1937) – Mrs. Allardyce
 Clothes and the Woman (1937) – Eugenia
 Stage Door (1937) – Miss Luther
 A Damsel in Distress (1937) – Lady Caroline
 Zaza (1939) – Nathalie
 Half a Sinner (1940) – Mrs. Jefferson Breckenbridge
 Susan and God (1940) – Lady Wigstaff
 Kitty (1945) – Lady Susan Dowitt
 The Dark Corner (1946) – Mrs. Kingsley
 Monsieur Beaucaire (1946) – The Queen of France
 The Perils of Pauline (1947) – Julia Gibbs
 An Ideal Husband (1947) – Lady Markby
 Rope (1948) – Mrs. Anita Atwater
 The Girl from Manhattan (1948) – Mrs. Brooke
 Whirlpool (1950) – Tina Cosgrove (final film role)

References

Met Opera archives with quotes from various music critics on the premier of Peter Ibettson

Further reading
  Harlequinade: The Story of My Life, John Lane The Bodley Head (1929)

External links
 

 
 
 Constance Collier photo gallery at NYP Library
 Constance Collier picture gallery as a young woman at National Portrait Gallery, England
Collier in 1898 aged 20 on Philip Morris cigarette package
 Julian L'Estrange husband of Constance Collier (Wayback Machine)
Constance Collier portrait gallery University of Washington Sayre Collection
Collier goes for a ride in a pioneer airplane; during 1914 London-to-Manchester-to-London Air Race...the plane is a Maurice Farman Longhorn

1878 births
1955 deaths
English stage actresses
American silent film actresses
English film actresses
English silent film actresses
English acting coaches
English tax resisters
British emigrants to the United States
20th-century American actresses
19th-century English actresses
20th-century English actresses
American opera librettists
English opera librettists
Women opera librettists